The 2011 NFL Draft was the 76th installment of the annual NFL Draft, where the franchises of the National Football League select newly eligible football players. Like the 2010 draft, the 2011 draft was held at Radio City Music Hall in New York City, New York, over three days: this year, the first round took place on Thursday, April 28, 2011; the second and third rounds took place on Friday, April 29; with the final four rounds on Saturday, April 30, 2011. The Carolina Panthers, who had the worst record for the 2010 NFL season at 2–14, had the right to the first selection in the draft, where they selected Auburn University quarterback Cam Newton, who was the 2010 Heisman Trophy winner. The 2011 draft is regarded as one of the most talented draft classes in NFL history, as 12 of the first 16 players have been selected to the pro bowl. 

A second Heisman Trophy winner, running back Mark Ingram II from Alabama was selected by New Orleans late in the first round.  This was the eleventh draft which included multiple Heisman winners, and the first time ever that it has occurred in consecutive drafts (Sam Bradford and Tim Tebow in 2010). Five of the first six picks played college football in the  Southeastern Conference (SEC). For the second consecutive year—and the third time in NFL history—the top two selections of the draft won Offensive and Defensive Rookie of the Year awards, respectively. The top two picks in the draft, Cam Newton and Denver linebacker Von Miller, played against each other in Super Bowl 50 on the teams that drafted them. This marked the first time that the top two picks in a single draft faced each other in the Super Bowl. The Broncos won, with Miller winning Super Bowl MVP.

Teams were allowed ten minutes to make each selection in the first round, seven minutes per selection in the second round and five minutes in each of the subsequent rounds.  The time allotment ran out for the Baltimore Ravens on their first round pick, allowing the Kansas City Chiefs to move up to the 26th pick and dropping the Ravens to the 27th pick. Numerous draft prospects displayed Hall of Fame level talent throughout their careers, including three-time Defensive Player of the Year J. J. Watt, 2015 NFL MVP Cam Newton, Super Bowl 50 MVP Von Miller, 2015 and 2018 receiving yards leader Julio Jones, and perennial All-Pro players such as Richard Sherman, A. J. Green, Tyron Smith, Jason Kelce, Cameron Jordan, Cameron Heyward and Patrick Peterson.

The following is the breakdown of the 254 players selected by position:

Impact of labor situation

Despite an ongoing labor dispute between league owners and players over a new collective bargaining agreement (CBA), a provision in the expired CBA ensured that this draft would still take place, despite the fact that the owners had imposed a lockout to prevent the start of the league year. Fans in attendance at the draft expressed their displeasure with the lockout by booing NFL commissioner Roger Goodell during the event and chanting "We want football."

Due to the labor situation and the lockout, franchises were not able to trade players for draft selections (trades involving only selections were permitted), and were unable to sign or even contact drafted or undrafted players until the lockout was lifted. Because of the lockout, the Panthers could not sign or even negotiate with their first draft pick before the draft began, as other teams have done in years past.

The restriction on trading players extended to players selected in this draft—teams were unable to swap any player once selected, e.g. as happened in 2004 when the San Diego Chargers and New York Giants completed a draft day trade involving Eli Manning and Philip Rivers who had been selected first and fourth respectively. In addition, with no agreement in place between owners and players mandating future drafts, teams were advised by the league that any trades involving future draft picks would be made at the teams' "own risk". This warning did not dissuade several teams from making trades involving future selections.

The National Football League Players Association (NFLPA) considered plans to dissuade potential prospects from attending the draft, but a record 25 potential draftees attended the event, including Von Miller, who was one of the named plaintiffs in the players' antitrust lawsuit against the league.

Early entrants

A record 56 underclassmen announced their intention to forgo their remaining NCAA eligibility and declare themselves eligible to be selected in the draft. Of the 56 eligible underclassmen, 43 (or 76.8%) were drafted.

The selection of Newton, a junior, marked the third straight draft where the first overall selection was an underclassman.  Since non-seniors were first eligible to be drafted in 1990, fourteen first overall picks (including six of the last seven) have been players who have entered the draft early. Eight of the first ten players chosen in this draft were non-seniors, which broke the record of six set in 1997 and matched in 2006. Jake Locker and Von Miller were the only two seniors among the first ten draftees.

Determination of draft order

The draft order is based generally on each team's record from the previous season, with teams which qualified for the postseason selecting after those which failed to make the playoffs.

Player selections

Supplemental draft
A supplemental draft was held on August 22, 2011. For each player selected in the supplemental draft, the team forfeits its pick in that round in the draft of the following season. Six players were available in the supplemental draft, but only one was selected.

Notable undrafted players

Trades
In the explanations below, (D) denotes trades that took place during the draft, while (PD) indicates trades completed pre-draft.

Round one

Round two

Round three

Round four

Round five

Round six

Round seven

Forfeited picks

Two picks in the 2011 draft were forfeited:

Selections by college conference
The players selected in this draft played in the following college football athletic conferences (Division I FBS or FCS unless otherwise indicated):

See also

 List of first overall National Football League draft picks
 Mr. Irrelevant – last overall National Football League draft picks

References
Notes

General references
 
 
 
 

Trade references

Specific references

National Football League Draft
NFL Draft
Draft
NFL Draft
Radio City Music Hall
NFL Draft
American football in New York City
2010s in Manhattan
Sporting events in New York City
Sports in Manhattan